Alupati is a village in Kamrup district of Assam.

See also
 Akadi

References

Villages in Kamrup district